Quartet is a 1981 historical drama film directed by James Ivory from a screenplay by Ruth Prawer Jhabvala, based on the 1928 novel of the same name by Jean Rhys. The film stars Alan Bates, Maggie Smith, Isabelle Adjani and Anthony Higgins, and is set in 1927 Paris. It premiered at the 1981 Cannes Film Festival.

Plot
The beautiful Marya "Mado" Zelli is living with her husband Stephan, a Polish art dealer, in 1927 Paris. When he is convicted of selling stolen artwork, and imprisoned for one year, Marya is left penniless, with no means to support herself. At Stephan's urging, she moves into the apartment of some acquaintances, H.J. Heidler, a wealthy English art dealer, and his wife Lois, a painter. H.J. has a history of inviting vulnerable young women to move into the "spare room" only to seduce them. Lois permits this arrangement because she wants to keep H.J. from leaving her.

Marya becomes involved in the decadent Parisien lifestyle of the Heidlers and their group of fellow expatriates. Although she initially resists H.J.'s advances, Mado eventually begins an affair with him. The strain of living with the Heidlers begins to manifest itself; Marya becomes desperate to leave, and begs Lois to loan her money so she can get away. Lois, although extremely unhappy with the situation, is reluctant to interfere at the risk of alienating H.J. Her behavior towards Marya is increasingly passive-aggressive and insulting. During a hunting excursion to the countryside, Marya angrily confronts the pair, causing Lois to break down in anguish.

After this H.J. arranges for Marya to live in a hotel, where he visits her less and less for sexual trysts. She grows lonely and depressed, contemplating suicide. During a tea party at the Heidlers', Lois casually reveals that H.J.'s previous mistress drowned herself in despair. When things are at their worst, Stephan is released from prison and must leave France immediately. Heidler threatens to break with her entirely if she returns to her husband, and although Marya has longed to be re-united with Stephan, she is unable to choose between the two. Stephan realizes the truth, and the film ends with him abandoning Marya to an uncertain future.

Cast
 Isabelle Adjani as Marya Zelli (nickname Mado)
 Alan Bates as H. J. Heidler
 Maggie Smith as Lois Heidler
 Anthony Higgins as Stephan Zelli
 Sheila Gish as Anna
 Suzanne Flon as Madame Hautchamp
 Pierre Clementi as Theo
 Daniel Mesguich as Pierre Schlamovitz
 Virginie Thévenet as Mademoiselle Chardin
 Daniel Chatto as Guy
 Armelia McQueen as night club singer

Release
The film was released by the Cohen Media Group on DVD and Blu-ray in 2019. Robert Abele of the Los Angeles Times said that "Whether the arc of Marya's fate feels overly engineered to you or not, Quartet retains its power to unsettle in its accumulation of cuts and bruises, the rare Merchant-Ivory-Jhabvala effort that mines a glamorized past not for nuanced dignity but for a kind of elegant, honest sordidness."

Reception
 

Variety wrote: "Director James Ivory takes his usual aloofly observant distance and the film's love triangle loses some drastic impetus."

Awards
 1981 Cannes Film Festival: Best Actress for Isabelle Adjani
 Evening Standard Awards: Best Actress for Maggie Smith

References

External links
 Quartet at Merchant Ivory Productions
 
 
 

1981 films
1981 drama films
1981 multilingual films
1980s British films
1980s French films
1980s historical drama films
British historical drama films
British multilingual films
English-language French films
Films based on British novels
Films directed by James Ivory
Films set in 1924
Films set in Paris
Films with screenplays by Ruth Prawer Jhabvala
French historical drama films
French multilingual films
Merchant Ivory Productions films